Anoushay Abbasi is a Pakistani television actress and model. She started her career as a child artist at PTV.  In her acting career, she is widely known for her leading roles in the television series Mera Saaein 2 (2012), Meri Saheli Meri Humjoli (2012), Tootay Huway Per (2011), Nanhi (2013), Pyarey Afzal (2013), Malika-e-Aliya (2014), Bhanwar (2014), Malika-e-Aliya Season 2 (2015), Meray Paas Tum Ho (2019), Raqs-e-Bismil (2020) and Benaam (2021).

Life and career
Abbasi started her career as a child artist and appeared in various television serials of PTV. She appeared in serial Tootay Huway Per opposite Aiza Khan, Sami Khan and Mohib Mirza and appeared in Geo TV serial Kaahe Ko Biyahee Bades opposite Sami Khan and Ahsan Khan, ARY Digital serial Mera Saaein 2 opposite Fahad Mustafa, Aiza Khan and Mahnoor Baloch and Urdu 1 serial Meri Saheli Meri Humjoli opposite Hasan Ahmed, Neelam Muneer and Faizan Khawaja.

She appeared in the ARY Digital serial Kaala Jadu, Geo TV serial Nanhi and Roshini Andhera Roshini on ATV for which she earned the Lux Style Award for Best TV Actress (Terrestrial).

Abaasi married actor Ainan Arif, son of cricket player Taslim Arif and actress Rubina Arif on September 27, 2014.

In 2019, she made her acting come back with Mere Paas Tum Ho.

Filmography

Television

As host

Short film

Web series

Music video

References

External links

Living people
Pakistani television actresses
Actresses from Lahore
Pakistani female models
21st-century Pakistani actresses
Female models from Punjab, Pakistan
1993 births
People from Lahore